The Frederick Lauer Monument is a monumental statue in Reading, Pennsylvania, United States. The statue was dedicated in 1885 in honor of Frederick Lauer, who was a prominent citizen and brewer from the town who served as the first president of the United States Brewers' Association. The association paid for the creation of the monument, which was designed by sculptor George F. Stephens and located in City Park.

History 
Frederick Lauer was born in 1810 in the German town of Gleisweiler. Several years later, in 1823, his family emigrated to the United States, ultimately settling in Reading, Pennsylvania. He learned the process of beer brewing from his father and operated his own brewery in Reading as an adult, emplying many German immigrants who lived in the area. During his time as a brewmaster, Lauer also became involved in politics and philanthropic ventures. He was involved in several different charity organizations, as well as the local agricultural society and board of trade, and he was instrumental in getting Reading reclassified from a borough to a city. In the national brewing industry, Lauer helped form the United States Brewers' Association, an industry trade group formed during the American Civil War. He served as the first president of this group, which today is known as the Beer Institute. In 1883, he retired from brewing, and he died on September 12 of that year.

Following his death, the Brewers' Association wanted to honor Lauer with a monument in his hometown. After receiving consent from the city council to erect a monument in Reading's City Park, the group proceeded to completely fund the creation of a public statue of Lauer. This monument would be the first public statue in both the park and the city as a whole. Despite some opposition from members of the temperance movement, the city was generally supportive of the monument based on Lauer's philanthropy and public service. According to a later article on the statue published by the Historical Society of Berks County, "Frederick Lauer was represented in the first monument erected in Reading because he embodied the ideals of a large part of his community". The park would later serve as the home for several other monuments and memorials.

The statue was designed by George F. Stephens and cast by the Bureau Bros, while the stonework was carried out by P. F. Eisenbrown, Sons & Company. The monument was dedicated on May 23, 1885, with a parade held through the city. Many stores closed for the day, while the parade included many city officials, police, and firefighters. During the dedication ceremony, Henry H. Reuter, a former president of the Brewers' Association, gave an oration, during which he said, "Frederick Lauer stands there, for us, as the exemplar of true temperance, as the champion of personal liberty, as the exponent of the just claims of our time-honored trade, as its ever-ready defender and untiring promoter. Frederick Lauer felt and understood his social mission as a brewer".

Later history 
In 1994, the monument was surveyed as part of the Save Outdoor Sculpture! project. In the years since its unveiling, the monument was suffered from deterioration and vandalism. In April 2015, four bronze plaques that were attached to the monument were stolen and never recovered. Around this same time, several brewing groups and local breweries began to spearhead efforts to restore the monument. These efforts were primarily led by the Brewers of Pennsylvania trade group, while the Brewers Association (not to be confused with the United States Brewers' Association) donated $25,000 towards the restoration. In 2018, the monument was rededicated following its restoration. The monument is maintained by the Historical Society of Berks County.

Design 

The monument consists of a bronze statue of Lauer standing atop a multitiered granite pedestal and concrete base. The base of the monument is surrounded by an edged planter. Lauer wears an attire typical of the era, including a bow tie, frock coat, and vest, with his right hand on his hip and a paper scroll in his left hand. At the foot of the statue are inscriptions bearing the name of the designer ("Henrici Stephens") and the foundry ("cast by / Bureau Bros.").

Four bronze plaques are attached to the four sides of the pedestal. The inscription on the front reads: "To / Frederick Lauer / of Reading, PA / The United States Brewers / Association of which he was / the first President, has / erected this monument / in grateful rememberence (sic) of / his unselfish labor for / the welfare of the / brewing trade in this country.", while the rear plaque reads: "The City of Reading / commemorates the public / and private virtues of an honored citizen / by the grant of this location, / erected AD MDCCCXXXV / the year of the 25th convention of the U.S. Brewers Association." The two side plaques read: "LET HIS EXAMPLE TELL / THE BREWERS OF THIS / COUNTRY TO MAINTAIN / GOOD-FELLOWSHIP TO / PRESERVE THEIR ASSOCIATION / AND / TO DEFEND THEIR RIGHTS" and "His zeal sprung / from his firm conviction / that in striving to advance / the brewing trade / he was working for / the cause of national temperance".

Notes

References

Sources

External links 

 

1885 establishments in Pennsylvania
1885 sculptures
Bronze sculptures in Pennsylvania
Buildings and structures in Reading, Pennsylvania
Outdoor sculptures in Pennsylvania
Sculptures of men in Pennsylvania
Statues in Pennsylvania
Tourist attractions in Reading, Pennsylvania
Vandalized works of art in Pennsylvania